Thierry Caens (born 1958) is a French classical trumpeter.

Life 
Born in Dijon (Burgundy), Caens began studying the trumpet at the age of six with his father Marcel Caens (also father of the saxophonist Jean-Pierre Caens). He was a pupil of Robert Pichaureau, Pierre Pollin and Maurice André.

In 1997, he obtained the first prize for trumpet and the first prize for cornet in 1978 at the Conservatoire de Paris in Maurice André's class.

A sought-after soloist, he is a guest of the world's greatest venues, from Victoria Hall in Geneva to Tokyo Bunka Kaikan, the United States, China, Italy and Paris (Salle Pleyel, Salle Gaveau, Radio France, Théâtre des Champs-Élysées, Théâtre du Châtelet, etc.). With Jean-François Paillard, he has recorded the main pages of J.S Bach, G.F Handel and J. Haydn.

He also played the solo trumpet part of more than 50 soundtracks, including Jean-Paul Rappeneau's Cyrano de Bergerac.

A great soloist, Caens is at the origin of many projects and arrangements.

Career 
 Solo trumpet with the Orchestre National de Lyon in 1975.
 Founder of the "Arban Qunitet" with Jean-Paul Leroy (trumpet teacher at the Orléans Conservatory) in 1976.
 Solo cornet at the Opéra Garnier in 1982.
 Professor at the Dijon Conservatory since 1985.
 Artistic director of the Camerata de Bourgogne, Burgundy Chamber Orchestra, since 1987.

He also played with Yves Henry and founded a trio with Michel Becquet and André Cazalet, soloist with the Orchestre de Paris.

References

External links 
 
 Thierry Caens's biography (FR3)
 Discography (Discogs)

1958 births
Living people
Musicians from Dijon
Conservatoire de Paris alumni
French classical trumpeters
Male trumpeters
French music educators
20th-century French musicians
21st-century French musicians
21st-century trumpeters
20th-century French male musicians
21st-century French male musicians